Emilia Fahlin (born 24 October 1988) is a Swedish road racing cyclist, who currently rides for UCI Women's WorldTeam . Fahlin has won the Swedish National Road Race Championships three times (2008, 2013, 2018) and the Swedish National Time Trial Championships three times in a row from 2009 to 2011.

Career
Born in Örebro, Sweden, Fahlin competed at the 2012 Summer Olympics in London during the women's road race, finishing 19th, and in the women's time trial, finishing 17th. At the 2016 Summer Olympics in Rio de Janeiro, she finished 27th in the Women's road race. Two weeks later, in late-August 2016, she won her first World Tour race, the Open de Suède Vårgårda in Sweden.

In June 2019, Fahlin announced that she would be taking a break from racing to recover from injuries sustained in a training crash. She returned in September to place 15th in the 2019 UCI World Championships Road Race.

Major results

Source:

2005
 National Junior Road Championships
1st  Road race
2nd Time trial
2006
 3rd Road race, National Junior Championships
2007
 1st Skandisloppet
2008
 1st  Road race, National Road Championships
 1st Overall Svanesunds 3-dagars
1st Stages 1, 2 & 4
 1st Stage 3 Redlands Bicycle Classic
 1st Stage 1 (TTT) Giro della Toscana Int. Femminile
 10th Overall Tour de Pologne Feminin
2009
 1st  Time trial, National Road Championships
 1st Tour of California Women's Criterium
 2nd Time trial, UEC European Under-23 Road Championships
 7th Prijs Stad Roeselare
2010
 National Road Championships
1st  Time trial
 1st Stage 1 (TTT) Giro della Toscana Int. Femminile
 2nd Time trial, UEC European Under-23 Road Championships
 8th GP Mameranus
 9th Chrono Gatineau
 9th Chrono Champenois – Trophée Européen
 9th Time trial, UCI Road World Championships
 10th Overall Profile Ladies Tour
1st Young rider classification
2011
 National Road Championships
1st  Time trial
3rd Road race
 Tour Cycliste Féminin International de l'Ardèche
1st Prologue, Stages 2, 5 & 6
 9th Time trial, UCI Road World Championships
2012
1st Stage 4b Energiewacht Tour
1st Nederhasselt
 National Road Championships
2nd Road race
3rd Time trial
2013
 National Road Championships
1st  Road race
5th Time trial
 9th Grand Prix de Dottignies
2014
 National Road Championships
4th Road race
4th Time trial
2015
 4th Team time trial, UCI Road World Championships
2016
 1st Open de Suède Vårgårda
2017
 4th Overall BeNe Ladies Tour
 Open de Suède Vårgårda
5th Team Time Trial
8th Road race
 9th Road race, UCI Road World Championships
 10th Road race, UEC European Road Championships
2018
 National Road Championships
1st  Road race
2nd Time trial
 1st  Overall Gracia–Orlová
1st  Points classification
1st Stages 1, 2 & 4
 2nd Overall Ladies Tour of Norway
 UCI Road World Championships
 4th Road race
 4th Team time trial
 4th Overall Belgium Tour
 5th Open de Suède Vårgårda TTT
 6th Overall Madrid Challenge by La Vuelta
 7th Ladies Tour of Norway (TTT)
2019
 5th Overall Festival Elsy Jacobs
 7th Trofeo Alfredo Binda
 8th Three Days of Bruges–De Panne
 9th Tour of Guangxi Women's WorldTour
 9th Grand Prix International d'Isbergues
2020
 National Road Championships
2nd Road race
3rd Time trial
 4th Omloop van het Hageland
 5th Brabantse Pijl
 7th La Course by Le Tour de France
2021
 5th Overall Thüringen Ladies Tour
 6th Gent–Wevelgem
 8th Brabantse Pijl
 9th Trofeo Alfredo Binda

References

External links

Living people
Olympic cyclists of Sweden
Swedish female cyclists
Cyclists at the 2012 Summer Olympics
Cyclists at the 2016 Summer Olympics
1988 births
Sportspeople from Örebro
20th-century Swedish women
21st-century Swedish women